Preacher Jack was the stage name of John Lincoln Coughlin (born February 12, 1942), who is an American pianist. Coughlin taught himself piano growing up in Malden, Massachusetts, and became an underground success playing in Boston in the 1960s and 1970s. George Thorogood heard him play and had him signed to Rounder Records, for whom he would record two albums in the 1980s. He took an extended break from recording in the 1990s and continued touring, finally releasing new material, including another album on Rounder, late in the decade.

Discography

Records:
Rounder Records 1979 - “Rock n Roll Preacher” - full length record
Rounder Records 1980 - “3000 Barrooms Later” - also a full length record
Solo Art Records 1996 - “Preacher Jack At The Piano Non-Stop Boogie - full length CD
Black Rose Records 1998 - “Celebration of the Spirit” - full length CD
Cow Island Music 2007 - “Pictures From Life’s Other Side” - full length CD

Singles:　
Rounder Records 1980 - “Almost Persuaded” - 45 rpm single
Sonet Records 1980 - “Break Up/Preachers Boogie Woogie” - 45 rpm import only single (Sonet was a subsidiary of Rounder)
Baron Records 1983 (?) - “Crazy Arms/You Win Again with It’ll Be Me/Don’t Be Cruel” - 45 rpm red vinyl single

Compilations:
Eagle Records - 1996 - “Rare Boston Rock A Billy Fifties Volume 2” - 2 songs on this CD
Make Some Noise Records - 2007 - “Music For The Great Boston Burlesque Exposition” - 1 song on this CD
Rounder Records - 2000 - “Roots Music: An American Journey CD” - 1 song on this CD
Lap to Cry on Records - 1998 - “Jerry Lee’s Nightmare” from the CD “princecharlesmingusmansonbukowski“ by Jawn P (formerly of the Boston hip-hop act Top Choice Clique) - a tribute to Preacher Jack.

References
 [ Preacher Jack] at Allmusic.com

External links
 Preacher Jack on Myspace

Musicians from Massachusetts
1942 births
Living people
20th-century American pianists
American male pianists
21st-century American pianists
20th-century American male musicians
21st-century American male musicians